Tibraide mac Fearchair (died 781 or 790) was Abbot of Clonfert.

There is some confusion over the length of Tibraide's term of office, as his death is listed twice in the annals, under 781 and 790. The explanation may be accidental reproduction, or two men of the same name successively holding office.

References

 Annals of Ulster at CELT: Corpus of Electronic Texts at University College Cork
 Annals of Tigernach at CELT: Corpus of Electronic Texts at University College Cork
Revised edition of McCarthy's synchronisms at Trinity College Dublin.
 Byrne, Francis John (2001), Irish Kings and High-Kings, Dublin: Four Courts Press, 
 Lysaght, Eamonn (1978), The Surnames of Ireland. , pp. 233–34.

People from County Galway
8th-century Irish abbots
778 deaths
Year of birth unknown